Rulle på Rullseröd ("Rulle at Rullseröd") was the Sveriges Television's Christmas calendar in 1974.

Plot 
Rulle lives on a farm in Bohuslän in Sweden together with his grandfather and grandmother on his father's side.

Video 
On 24 October 2012, the series was released to DVD.

References

External links 
 

1974 Swedish television series debuts
1974 Swedish television series endings
Sveriges Television's Christmas calendar
Television shows set in Sweden
Bohuslän in fiction